Danford Balch (November 29, 1811 –  October 17, 1859) (alternate spelling Danforth) was a mid-19th-century settler in what later became the Willamette Heights neighborhood of Portland in the U.S. state of Oregon. He was born on November 29, 1811, in Colrain, Massachusetts, but spent his early years in Onondaga County, New York. A commemorative stone at Northwest 30th Avenue and Upshur Street marks the spot of the Balch homesite. A family named Stump, with whom the Balches quarreled, settled a nearby claim.

Nine years later, Balch was convicted of murdering Mortimer Stump, who had eloped with and married Balch's oldest child, Anna, against her father's wishes. In front of witnesses, Balch killed Stump with a shotgun as Mortimer and Anna boarded the Stark Street Ferry to cross the Willamette River. While awaiting trial, Balch escaped to a hideout in the woods near his farm. Apprehended by James Lappeus, the city marshal, Balch was tried and convicted in August and hanged before a crowd of several hundred onlookers on October 17, 1859. The hanging was the first legal one in the city.

According to a news article citing Metsker's Atlas of Multnomah County, the Balch property ran from "Vaughn Street near then-named St. Helens Boulevard in the northwest corner, south of Cornell Road in the southwest corner, and directly east downhill to the vicinity of 22nd Avenue." Balch's land included what later became Macleay Park (now part of Forest Park), through which runs Balch Creek. Later United States Senator, and scandal plagued attorney, John H. Mitchell served as trustee of Balch's property and benefited financially from this role.

References

External links 
 
 Probate lawsuit

Oregon pioneers
Criminals from Portland, Oregon
People from Onondaga County, New York
1811 births
1859 deaths
19th-century executions of American people
People from Colrain, Massachusetts